Southern Army may refer to:

 Southern Expeditionary Army Group, part of the Imperial Japanese Army during the World War II era
 Southern Army, a name under which Southern Command of the British Indian Army operated from 1942–45
 Southern Army of Gondor, from J. R. R. Tolkien's Middle-earth fiction
 Confederate States Army of the U.S. Civil War
 Southern Army (Italy)